Grey ministry may refer to:
 1877–1879 Grey Ministry, the New Zealand responsible government led by George Grey
 Grey ministry (United Kingdom), the British government led by Charles Grey, 2nd Earl Grey, from 1830 to 1834